Sea chest may refer to:  
Sea chest (nautical)
Seaman's chest

See also
 Seacrest